Joseph Craig may refer to:

Joseph A. Craig High School, a public high school in Janesville, Wisconsin, named after Joseph A. Craig, who was instrumental in attracting the General Motors Janesville Assembly plant to the city
Joe Craig (baseball) (1918–1991), American Negro leagues baseball player
Joe Craig (footballer) (born 1954), former Scottish footballer
Joe Craig (writer) (born 1981), British writer
Joe Craig (Canadian football) (born 1992), Canadian football wide receiver